The Ministry of Public Relations and Public Affairs is the Sri Lankan government ministry responsible for “building up a public service, dedicated to enhance public relations and perform public affairs efficiently which support the economic and social development of Sri Lanka within the government policies through proper coordination with other government organisation.”

List of ministers

The Minister of Public Relations & Public Affairs is an appointment in the Cabinet of Sri Lanka.

Parties

See also
 List of ministries of Sri Lanka

References

External links
 Ministry of Public Relations & Public Affairs
 Government of Sri Lanka

Public Relations and Public Affairs